Steven William Breaston  (born August 20, 1983) is a former American football wide receiver. He was drafted by the Arizona Cardinals in the fifth round of the 2007 NFL Draft. He played college football at Michigan. Breaston also played for the Kansas City Chiefs.

Early years
Breaston grew up in North Braddock, Pennsylvania and attended Woodland Hills High School in suburban Pittsburgh, PA. Breaston lettered three times in football at Woodland Hills High School, where he led the team to a 14-1 record and to a berth in the Pennsylvania 4-A state championship game. He helped Woodland Hills win the WPIAL Class AAAA title, gaining 219 yards on 15 carries during a 41-6 victory. The Gatorade Pennsylvania Player of the Year in 2001, Breaston was rated the third-best skill athlete and was named Northeast Offensive Player of the Year by Super Prep. He received a four-star rating and was ranked as the nation's eighth-best "athlete" by Rivals100.com.

Breaston was selected as Pittsburgh Post-Gazette's co-Player of the Year (with quarterback Tyler Palko) and named an All-American running quarterback by Max Emfinger. The versatile athlete gained 2,545 career rushing yards and 37 touchdowns as a quarterback. As a senior, he carried 151 times for 1,718 yards (11.4-yard average) and 24 touchdowns, completed 33 of 79 passes for 600 yards and was involved in 34 scores overall, including 10 touchdown runs of more than 50 yards.

Breaston returned two punts for touchdowns as a senior, including a 93-yarder vs. McKeesport Area High School, and accounted for more than 5,000 all-purpose yards during his last two seasons combined. Breaston lettered twice in basketball and track, winning the district title in the 300-meter hurdles as a junior.

College career
Breaston played for the Michigan Wolverines for four seasons (2003–2006).  He is the most prolific return man in school history and his 156 career receptions are fifth most in Michigan history.

Records
Breaston is Michigan's all-time leading punt returner (127 returns for 1,599 yards) and kickoff returner (81 returns for 1,993 yards).  He returned four punts for touchdowns, which ties him with Gene Derricotte and Derrick Alexander for the school record, and one kickoff for a score.  His combined total of five returns for touchdowns is a Michigan record.  Breaston's punt returns and punt return yardage marks are also Big Ten Conference records.  Breaston ranks seventh in conference annals in kickoff returns and kickoff return yardage. On January 1, 2005, Breaston set a Rose Bowl record with 315 all-purpose yards.

National awards
2006 Maxwell Award watchlist
2006 Walter Camp Award watchlist
2006 Biletnikoff Award watchlist

Conference honors
 2003 Big Ten Freshman of the Year (coaches)
 2006 Big Ten Conference Sportsmanship Award Honoree
 Four-time Big Ten Football Special Teams Player of the Week

200-yard games at Michigan
Breaston had ten games in his U-M career in which he had more than 200 all-purpose yards, as follows:

Statistics

Professional career

Pre-draft

Arizona Cardinals
Breaston was drafted by the Arizona Cardinals with the 142nd pick in the fifth round of the 2007 NFL Draft. In the fourth game of the 2007 season against the Pittsburgh Steelers, Breaston took a punt back 73 yards for a touchdown, which proved to be the key score, as the Cardinals went on to win the game.  Through week 13 of the 2007 season, Breaston had 1,462 return yards for the Cardinals.

Breaston had a breakout year in 2008.  Following a serious injury to perennial Pro Bowl receiver Anquan Boldin, Breaston was inserted into the Cardinals' starting line-up at wide receiver. Breaston notably refused to participate in pre-game introductions at home games due to his opinion that he was still a backup, keeping a seat warm for the usual starter Anquan Boldin.  Breaston finished the year with 1,006 yards, and he, Boldin, and Larry Fitzgerald became the fifth 1,000 yard receiving trio in NFL history.
Breaston's final stats with the Cardinals were 140 receptions, 1810 yards (12.9 avg), and 6 touchdowns

Kansas City Chiefs
On July 29, 2011 Breaston signed a five-year deal with the Kansas City Chiefs. In a week 5 game against the Colts, Breaston played an important role by catching 2 touchdowns to lead the Chiefs to a 28-24 comeback victory. Breaston finished the year with 785 receiving yards and two touchdowns.  In 2012, he only had 74 yards.  He was released by the Chiefs on February 19, 2013.

New Orleans Saints
On August 5, 2013, Breaston signed a one-year deal with the New Orleans Saints. On August 19, 2013, he was released by the Saints.

NFL career statistics

Personal life
Breaston’s cousin is Toney Clemons.

See also
Lists of Michigan Wolverines football receiving leaders

References

External links
Arizona Cardinals bio
ESPN NFL profile
ESPN college profile

1983 births
Living people
People from North Braddock, Pennsylvania
African-American players of American football
Players of American football from Pennsylvania
American football wide receivers
American football return specialists
Michigan Wolverines football players
Arizona Cardinals players
Kansas City Chiefs players
New Orleans Saints players
21st-century African-American sportspeople
20th-century African-American people